Vittel is a French brand of bottled water sold in many countries.  Since 1992 it has been owned by the Swiss company Nestlé. It is among the leading French mineral water companies, along with Perrier and Evian.

Vittel is produced using mineral water that is sourced from the "Great Spring" in Vittel, France, and has been bottled and made available for curative and, increasingly, for commercial purposes since 1854.

Vittel has been the water provider for the London Marathon, for the tenth consecutive year in 2008.

References

Further reading
 

1854 establishments in France
Bottled water brands
Nestlé brands
Mineral water
Companies based in Grand Est
Food and drink companies established in 1854